Dimas Gonçalves de Oliveira (born 30 September 1984) is a Brazilian footballer who plays for Italian club Sacilese.

Career 
Dimas signed his first professional contract in 2004 for Villafranca, after eighteen games who scores three goals signed in July 2005 for U.S.D. Virtusvecomp Verona. He left after two years U.S.D. Virtusvecomp Verona in August 2007 and signed for A.C. Sambonifacese. On 12 August 2009 A.C. ChievoVerona have contracted the Brazilian striker, the 25-year-old joins from A.C. Sambonifacese and the contract runs over three-years and joined on 27 August 2009 on loan to A.C. Monza Brianza 1912 between 30 June 2010.

On 1 February 2010 Dimas joined (on loan) another time the A.C. Sambonifacese.

In summer 2010, Dimas joined Montichiari for €30,000. Chievo also retained 50% registration rights, but gave up in June 2011 for free.

Since 2014 he played for 4 Serie D clubs, most recently Pergolettese.

In summer 2017 he joined ASD Chions. With them he won the Eccellenza Friuli-Venezia Giulia getting the promotion to Serie D.

Ahead of the 2019/20 season, Dimas joined Montecchio Maggiore.

Ahead of the 2020/21 season, Dimas joined Torviscosa, and during the 2021/22 season, Dimas joined Sacilese, both teams in the Friuli regional leagues.

References

External links
 
 Schede analitica di Dimas Oliveira Goncalves – a cura di Football.it 

1984 births
Living people
Brazilian footballers
Brazilian expatriate footballers
Footballers from São Paulo (state)
Expatriate footballers in Italy
A.C. Sambonifacese players
A.C. ChievoVerona players
A.C. Montichiari players
Sport Club Corinthians Paulista players
S.S. Teramo Calcio players
U.S. Pergolettese 1932 players
A.C. Monza players
Serie C players
Serie D players
Association football forwards